Marina Yakubovna Shamal (born 9 April 1939) is a retired Russian swimmer. She competed at the 1960 Summer Olympics and finished eights in the 4×100 m freestyle and medley relays. She was a national champion in the 100 m freestyle (1962, 1963), 4×100 m freestyle (1955) and 4×100 m medley events (1956).

She married Igor Luzhkovsky, who also competed at the 1960 Olympics in swimming, and changed her last name to Luzhkovskaya. After retiring from competitions she worked as a coach in swimming and synchronized swimming.

References

1939 births
Living people
Russian female swimmers
Russian Jews
Swimmers at the 1960 Summer Olympics
Olympic swimmers of the Soviet Union
Russian female freestyle swimmers
Soviet female swimmers